The European Union Intellectual Property Office (EUIPO), founded in 1994, is the European Union Agency responsible for the registration of the European Union trade mark (EUTM) (formerly known as "community trade mark") and the registered Community design (RCD), two unitary intellectual property rights valid across the 27 Member States of the EU. Every year, it registers an average of 135 000 EU trade marks and close to 100 000 designs. The EUIPO is also responsible for maintaining an Orphan Works Registry. Registered works have certain permitted acts under the Orphan Works Directive.

The EUIPO is based in Alicante, on the south-east coast of Spain, and there are five working languages at the Office – English, French, German, Italian and Spanish. The office also processes trade mark and design applications in 23 official languages of the EU.

EUIPO was formerly known as the Office for Harmonization in the Internal Market (OHIM). The OHIM underwent some reforms and the Office as well as several positions and the governing board were renamed to mirror these changes. Since March 2016, OHIM has been known by its current name. The head of the agency was changed from President to Executive Director.

Functions
The Office is in charge of managing the registration of the EU trade mark and the registered Community design and offers businesses and citizens exclusive rights for trade mark and design protection throughout the European Union (EU), with a single application.

The work of this EU agency extends beyond registration to cover the harmonisation of registration practices for trade marks and designs and the development of common IP management tools. This work is carried out in cooperation with the national and regional IP offices throughout the EU-27, user associations and other institutional partners with the objective of offering users of the trade mark and design system a similar registration experience, be it at national or at EU level.

Since 2012, the EUIPO has hosted the European Observatory on Infringements of Intellectual Property Rights, which brings public and private stakeholders together in the fight against piracy and counterfeiting.

Additionally, the EUIPO is charged with establish and manage portals on EU Orphan Works and EU Out of Commerce works, including a database to register these types of works.

Legal background
The regulation establishing the EUIPO was adopted by the Council of the European Union in December 1993 and revised on two occasions, in 2009 and in 2015. It created the European Union trade mark (formerly known as the Community trade mark) as a legal instrument in European Union law and established the EUIPO (formerly known as Office for Harmonization in the Internal Market or OHIM) as an EU agency with legal, administrative and financial autonomy.

Council Regulation (EC) No 6/2002 of 12 December 2001 created the registered Community design.

On 23 March 2016, the Office changed its name to the European Union Intellectual Property Office upon the entry into force of Regulation 2015/2424.

Amending Regulation 2015/2424
On 23 March 2016, the Office changed its name to the European Union Intellectual Property Office upon the entry into force of Regulation 2015/2424. The Regulation brought about changes in three different areas: trade mark fees, technical changes and institutional changes.

The fee system changed from a basic fee that covered up to three classes of goods and services to a ‘pay-per-class' system, with an online fee of EUR 850 for one class, EUR 50 for the second class, and EUR 150 each for three or more classes.

From the technical point of view, the Regulation brought about a number of changes in the areas of graphic representation of the mark, examination proceedings, absolute grounds of refusal, relative grounds of refusal, goods and services, opposition and cancellation proceedings and appeals. It also created the certification mark, a new type of trade mark at EU level that allows a certifying institution to permit adherents to the certification system to use the mark as a sign for goods or services complying with the certification requirements.

Apart from the name changes, institutionally the Regulation defined clearly all EUIPO's tasks, including the framework for cooperation and convergence of practices between the Office and the EU national and regional IP offices.

Governance 
The governance structure of the EUIPO consists of a management board and a Budget Committee, each composed of one representative from each Member State, two representatives from the European Commission and one representative from the European Parliament.

The Council of the European Union decides on the appointment of the Executive Director, the Deputy Executive Director, and the President and Chairpersons of the Boards of Appeal.

The OHIM Board of Appeal  is an administrative law body of the Office for Harmonization in the Internal Market (OHIM), which is responsible for deciding on appeals in trade mark and design matters registered in the European Union. They are able to make decisions both on points of law and points of fact.

Boards of  Appeal  

The Boards of Appeal are headed by the President of the Boards of Appeal, appointed by the Council of Ministers from a list prepared by the Administrative Board of OHIM.

The individual Boards are chaired by members appointed by the Council of Ministers. Other members of individual Boards are appointed by the Administrative Board of OHIM.  Boards are allowed to hear new evidence at their discretion, although not obligated to do so.
 
The Boards of Appeal are made up of four Boards for Trade Mark cases and one for design.  There is an additional Grand Board which may hear any cases appealed through OHIM. A case which is heard by a Board of Appeal is made up of three members.  This includes the Chairperson, who must sit on every case.  Two members of the Board must be legally qualified, though in some instances cases can be decided by the Grand Board or a single member. 
 
The Grand Board is made up of nine members.  It includes the presidents and chairpersons of the Boards, as well as some ordinary board members.  The Board was set up by Council Regulation 422/2004.  Cases are referred to the Grand Board based on legal difficulty, importance, or under special circumstances.  In some cases, the Presidium may refer a case to the Grand Board.

The Presidium oversees the rules and organisation of the Boards of Appeal.  It consists of the President of the Boards of Appeal, the Chairpersons of the Boards, and three board members elected for a calendar year.

The European Union trade mark and the registered Community design 
The European Union trade mark (EUTM) grants exclusive rights in all current and future Member States of the European Union through a single registration, filed online. The basic registration fee is EUR 850 and it covers one class of goods and services. An EU trade mark registration lasts for 10 years but can be renewed indefinitely in blocks of 10 years.

The registered Community design (RCD) also grants exclusive rights throughout the European Union and future Member States. The fee for registering and publishing one design is EUR 350. A registered Community design is initially valid for five years from the date of filing and can be renewed in blocks of five years up to a maximum of 25 years.

The DesignEuropa Awards 
The DesignEuropa Awards are organised by the EUIPO every two years to celebrate excellence in design and design management among registered Community design (RCD) holders, whether they are individual rights holders, small businesses or large enterprises. The first edition of the awards took place in Milan in 2016.

See also
 Benelux Office for Intellectual Property
 Community Plant Variety Office (CPVO)
 Intellectual property organisation
 Trade Mark eXtended Markup Language Standard

References

External links

New EU trade mark regulation
European Observatory on Infringements of Intellectual Property Rights
Transparency Portal
EU Agencies Network
DesignEuropa Awards

1994 in the European Union
European Union trademark law
Intellectual property organizations
Agencies of the European Union
Trademark law organizations
Alicante
Government agencies established in 1994
International organisations based in Spain
Intellectual property law of the European Union